"In the End" is a song by Linkin Park.

In the End may also refer to:

Music
 In the End (album), by the Cranberries, 2019
 In the End: Live & Rare, an EP by Linkin Park, 2002
 "In the End" (Black Veil Brides song), 2012
 "In the End" (Kat DeLuna song), 2008
 "In the End" (Snow Patrol song), 2012
 "In the End" (Stefanie Heinzmann song), 2015
 "In the End", a song by Anthrax from Worship Music
 "In the End", a song by Drake Bell from Telegraph
 "In the End", a song by Green Day from Dookie
 "In the End", a song by Passenger from The Boy Who Cried Wolf
 "In the End", a song by Rush from Fly by Night
 "In the End", a song by Shane Filan from You and Me
 "In the End", a song by Vanessa Carlton from Rabbits on the Run
 "In the End", a song by Yusuf Islam from An Other Cup

Other uses
 In the End (radio series), a sequel to In the Red, a radio adaptation of the novel by Mark Tavener
 "In the End", a short story by Neil Gaiman from Smoke and Mirrors

See also
 "And in the End...", the final episode of the TV series ER
 The End (disambiguation)